The following is a list of notable performers of rock and roll music or rock music, and others directly associated with the music as producers, songwriters, or in other closely related roles, who died in the 2020s decade. The list gives their date, cause and location of death, and their age.

Rock music developed from the rock and roll music that emerged during the 1950s and includes a diverse range of subgenres. The terms "rock and roll" and "rock" each have a variety of definitions, some narrow and some wider. In determining criteria for inclusion, this list uses as its basis reliable sources listing "rock deaths" or "deaths in rock and roll", as well as such sources as the Rock and Roll Hall of Fame

2020

2021

2022

2023

See also

27 Club 
List of murdered hip hop musicians 
List of deaths in rock and roll (1950s) 
List of deaths in rock and roll (1960s) 
List of deaths in rock and roll (1970s) 
List of deaths in rock and roll (1980s) 
List of deaths in rock and roll (1990s) 
List of deaths in rock and roll (2000s) 
List of deaths in rock and roll (2010s)

References

Deaths in rock and roll
Deaths in rock and roll

Rock and roll, 2020s
2020s deaths in rock and roll